Juan Carlos Zabala (October 11, 1911 – January 24, 1983), also known as "El Ñandú Criollo", was an Argentine long-distance runner, winner of the marathon race at the 1932 Summer Olympics.

Biography
Zabala ran his first marathon at the end of October 1931. Ten days after that he set a new world record in the 30 km (1:42:30.4). Later, before the 1936 Summer Olympics, Zabala would run a new world record in the 20 km (1:04:00.2).

Zabala's peak was the 1932 Olympic marathon race. He ran in the lead group almost the entire distance. With just four kilometres left, he broke free to finish 20 seconds ahead of Sam Ferris from Great Britain. Zabala also participated at the 1936 Summer Olympics, placing sixth over 10,000 m, but could not defend his Olympic title in the marathon. Zabala took the lead from the start, but tripped and fell at 28 km, and abandoned the race after 33 km when the main group caught him.

Zabala was the flag bearer for Argentina at the opening ceremony of the 1936 Summer Olympics. In 1983 he was named as Argentina's track and field athlete of the century.

References

1911 births
1983 deaths
Argentine male marathon runners
Olympic athletes of Argentina
Olympic gold medalists for Argentina
Athletes (track and field) at the 1932 Summer Olympics
Athletes (track and field) at the 1936 Summer Olympics
Sportspeople from Rosario, Santa Fe
Medalists at the 1932 Summer Olympics
Olympic gold medalists in athletics (track and field)